Holden Radcliffe is a fictional character appearing in American comic books published by Marvel Comics. The character is an enemy of Machine Teen.

The character made his live action debut on the Marvel Cinematic Universe TV series Marvel's Agents of S.H.I.E.L.D. played by John Hannah in the third and fourth seasons.

Publication history 
The character, created by Marc Sumerak and Mike Hawthorne, first appeared in Machine Teen #1 (July 2005).

Fictional character biography 
Within the context of the stories, Radcliffe is a businessman, scientist, and CEO of the Holden Radcliffe Corporation who is interested in developing androids as soldiers. Radcliffe forced Dr. Aaron Isaacs on the run after his chief scientist destroyed the work.

After years of searching for Dr. Isaacs who had created the robot son Adam at this point, he kidnaps Isaacs along with Adam and his friends. Radcliffe tortures Adam in an effort to brainwash and take control of the "boy", but this is a ruse and Radcliffe is later killed after Adam self-destructs.

In other media 
Holden Radcliffe appears in the television series Agents of S.H.I.E.L.D. portrayed by John Hannah. This iteration is more sympathetic than his comic book counterpart (as he genuinely seeks to help others without causing harm) and takes a keen interest in Leo Fitz as he feels that he respects his work. He first appears in "The Singularity" where Fitz and Jemma Simmons come to him for help in battling Hive, but he gets kidnapped by Hive's allies and is forced to create Inhumans where his experiments involving a compound of Terrigen Crystals, the blood of Daisy Johnson and a Kree Reaper, and Hive's parasitic physiology resulted in the Inhuman Primitives. Eventually, he is rescued by S.H.I.E.L.D. and is inspired to develop Life Model Decoys. After he unveils his A.I. AIDA to Fitz in "The Ghost" with his intention being to benefit mankind, Radcliffe turns on S.H.I.E.L.D. so as to possess the Darkhold for his own purposes, even replacing Melinda May with an LMD as part of his plan. Radcliffe then creates the Framework, a virtual reality which he had actually designed for his dying former lover Agnes Kitsworth (AIDA's inspiration). AIDA kills Radcliffe after realizing that he was a potential danger to the Framework (exploiting a flaw in his commands), though AIDA 'downloads' his consciousness as a way of "protecting" him. In the episode "Identity and Change", Radcliffe's consciousness is living out the rest of his existence with Agnes on the Framework island Ogygia until the arrival of Hydra and AIDA's virtual counterpart, resulting in Agnes's deletion and Radcliffe being taken away to be tortured. With nothing left to lose, Radcliffe resorts to helping the team escape the Framework through a 'back door' that he created. In the episode "World's End", Radcliffe meets up with Yo-Yo Rodriguez who entered the Framework to retrieve Mack when the world begins to slowly disappear. After Yo-Yo rescues Mack, Radcliffe sits on a beach with a bottle of alcohol resigned to his final moments. He quotes the final stanza in T. S. Eliot's The Hollow Men, but before he can finish, he is deleted along with the Framework.

References

External links 
 Holden Radcliffe at the Marvel Wiki

Comics characters introduced in 2005
Fictional British people
Fictional businesspeople
Marvel Comics characters
Marvel Comics scientists
Marvel Comics television characters